Jane Pearl Poole-Wilson, MHK (née Kissack) is a Manx politician and solicitor. She was elected to the Legislative Council of the Isle of Man (the upper branch of Tynwald) in 2017 to fill a casual vacancy and was re-elected for a full five-year term in 2018. However she was elected to the House of Keys for the constituency of Middle in the 2021 Manx general election (she easily topped the poll with almost twice as many votes as the other elected MHK) and thus forfeited her seat on the Legislative Council. She was immediately appointed by new Chief Minister Alfred Cannan as Minister for Justice and Home Affairs. She was also appointed as Deputy Chief Minister.

Early life and family 
Poole-Wilson attended Ballakermeen High School before studying Modern History at St Catherine's College, Oxford, graduating with a Bachelor of Arts degree. She then spent two years at Chester College of Law and secured a training contract at Eversheds, leading to her qualifying as a solicitor. As of 2017, she is married with two children.

Career 
As a solicitor, Poole-Wilson specialises in employment law. She worked for Eversheds and was seconded to the UK Financial Services Authority, before joining Simmons and Simmons. She became the principal in-house lawyer at UBS Investment Bank advising on human resources matters for Europe, the Middle East and Africa. She moved to the Isle of Man in 2005 and began working for a consultancy firm providing support for multinational corporations. She was Isle of Man Legal Aid Deputy Certifying Officer from 2007 to 2012.

Politics 
Poole-Wilson stood for election to the Legislative Council as an Independent in May 2017, following the resignation of Tony Wild; she was nominated by Daphne Caine and seconded by Bill Shimmins. She was elected, receiving 14 votes; her closest rival, Alan Wright, gained six. Since election, she has been Chairman of the Standing Committee on Constitutional and Legal Affairs and Justice, a member of the Select Committee of Tynwald on Library Provision and an Equality Champion. Her term expired in February 2018, but in March 2018 she was re-elected to the Legislative Council almost unanimously, coming top of the poll with 22 votes out of a possible 24.

References 

Living people
Members of the Legislative Council of the Isle of Man
Manx women in politics
Alumni of St Catherine's College, Oxford
Manx lawyers
British women lawyers
21st-century British women politicians
Year of birth missing (living people)